The Chief of the Army Staff (CAst, or Arméstabschef) is the professional head of the Swedish Army Staff. The post was created in 1936 with colonel Helge Jung as the first incumbent. The post disappeared in 1994 and was reintroduced in 2019 when the new Army Staff was established.

History
The Chief of the Army Staff was from 1937 to 1994 the second most senior member of the Swedish Army after the Chief of the Army and headed the Army Staff. The position was initially held by a colonel (1937–1943) and later by a major general (1943–1994). The Chief of the Army Staff was also Chief of the General Staff Corps. When the Army Staff was disbanded in 1994, the office was eliminated. In 2019, the Army Staff was re-established and a Chief of the Army Staff was appointed again, this time held by a colonel.

Chiefs of the Army Staff

Chiefs of the Army Staff (1937–1994)

Chiefs of the Army Staff (2019–present)

Vice Chiefs of the Army Staff

Footnotes

References

Print

Military appointments of Sweden
1937 establishments in Sweden
1994 disestablishments in Sweden
2019 establishments in Sweden
Army chiefs of staff